Råö is a locality in Kungsbacka Municipality, Halland, Sweden.

Halland
Populated places in Kungsbacka Municipality